Eric David Newsom (born 1943) is an American diplomat and State Department official.

Biography

Eric D. Newsom was born in Oklahoma and raised in Modesto, California. He graduated from Modesto High School in 1961. After high school, he attended the University of California, Berkeley, receiving a B.A. in History in 1965, and an M.A. in Modern European History in 1967.

Newsom joined the United States Foreign Service in October 1967. As a Foreign Service Officer, he served as Vice Consul in Montevideo, Uruguay; Special Assistant to the United States Ambassador to the United Kingdom; on the staff of the Office of the Secretary of State; Special Assistant to the Director for nuclear policy issues in the Bureau of Political-Military Affairs; and Deputy Director of the Office of International Security Policy.

Newsom left the Foreign Service in July 1979, at which time he became a professional staff member for national security affairs with the United States Senate Committee on Foreign Relations.

From February 1981 to August 1982, Newsom worked with former United States Secretary of State, Cyrus Vance, in the preparation of his memoirs.

In August 1982, Newsom became a professional staff member of the United States Senate Select Committee on Intelligence. From 1985 to 1987, he was the committee's Minority Staff Director. In January 1989, he became the Staff Director of the United States Senate Appropriations Subcommittee on State, Foreign Operations, and Related Programs, a position he held until March 1994.

In 1994, Newsom became Principal Deputy Assistant Secretary of State for Political-Military Affairs. In 1998, President of the United States Bill Clinton nominated Newsom as Assistant Secretary of State for Political-Military Affairs. After Senate confirmation, Newsom held this office from November 2, 1998 to December 31, 2000.

Upon retiring from government service effective December 31, 2000, Newsom joined the foreign policy and defense consulting firm of Collins and Company as Vice President for International Business.

References

State Department Profile
Profile from the Elliott School of International Affairs

1943 births
Living people
Politicians from Oklahoma
University of California, Berkeley alumni
George Washington University faculty
United States Foreign Service personnel
United States Assistant Secretaries of State
Elliott School of International Affairs faculty